"Aliens Act" or "Alien Act" can refer to:

 The Aliens Act 1698 (11 Will. 3 c. 6) (England)
 The Alien Act 1705 (England)
 The Aliens Act 1905 (UK)
 The Aliens Act of 1937 (South Africa)
 The Alien and Sedition Acts (USA)
 The Aliens Act (Sweden) (utlänningslagen)